Nihan Kaya (born 1979) is a fiction writer and theorist. She is known for her publications on aesthetic theory and creativity as well as her novels and short stories. She currently teaches at MEF University Psychology department in Istanbul.

Nihan Kaya received the Writers Union of Turkey (Türkiye Yazarlar Birliği) Award for The Sanctuary in 2004.

Selected list of works

Non-fiction
 2019 İyi Toplum Yoktur: Günlük Hayatta Toplumun Bireyi İstismar Biçimleri 
 2018 İyi Aile Yoktur 
 2013 Yazma Cesareti: Acının Yaratıcılığa Dönüşümü [The Courage to Write: Converting Suffering to Creativity] 
 2011 Fildişi Kuyu: Psikanalitik Edebiyat Eleştirisi ve Kadın [The Ivory Well: Psychoanalytic Literary Criticism and the Feminine]  (Collection of academic papers published between 1998-2011)
 2008 Compelled to Create: The Courage to Go Beyond. (In: Dreaming the Myth Onwards: Revisioning Jungian Therapy and Thought, edited by Lucy Huskinson)

Fiction
 2017 Kırgınlık [Resentment]
 2016 Kar ve İnci [The Snow and the Pearl]
 2012 Ama Sizden Değilim [I Am Not One of Us]
 2008 Disparöni [Dyspareunia]
 2006 Buğu [The Mist]
 2004 Çatı Katı [The Sanctuary]()
 2003 Gizli Özne [The Hidden Self]

References

External links
 
 
 
 
 
 
 
 
 
 
 
 
 
 
 
 Nihan Kaya web site

1979 births
Living people
Alumni of King's College London
Turkish writers